William F. Carr (August 4, 1910 – October 31, 1998) was an American politician who served as a member of the Massachusetts House of Representatives and Boston School Committee.

Early life
Carr was born on August 4, 1910 in South Boston. He graduated from South Boston High School and Boston College and later earned a master's in education from Boston Teachers College. During World War II, Carr served with the 45th Infantry Division. He earned five battle stars for action in Sicily, Italy, Southern France, and Germany. After the war, Carr worked in the transportation industry.

Political career
From 1949 to 1953, Carr represented the 7th Suffolk District in the Massachusetts House of Representatives. In 1951 he was elected to the Boston School Committee. He was reelected in 1953 and was named chairman of the board. In 1954, Carr was a candidate for State Treasurer. He finished a close third in the Democratic primary behind John Francis Kennedy and Clement A. Riley. He was reelected to the school committee again in 1955, finishing ahead of every other candidate. In 1956 he ran for Sheriff of Suffolk County. He finished behind incumbent Frederick R. Sullivan and Joseph C. White in a twelve candidate Democratic primary. Carr's tenure on the school committee ended following the 1957 election when he finished in eighth place.

Later life
After his political career ended, Carr served as executive secretary of the Suffolk County Registry of Deeds, ran a flower business, and worked at Wonderland Greyhound Park. He died on October 31, 1998 in South Boston.

See also
 1949–1950 Massachusetts legislature
 1951–1952 Massachusetts legislature

References

1910 births
1998 deaths
United States Army personnel of World War II
Boston College alumni
Boston School Committee members
Democratic Party members of the Massachusetts House of Representatives
People from South Boston
20th-century American politicians
Military personnel from Massachusetts
South Boston High School alumni